Dustin Rowe (born September 23, 1975) an American attorney from Oklahoma who is currently serving as a justice of the Oklahoma Supreme Court. He is a former City Attorney and one-time city councilman and mayor of Tishomingo, a city of about 3,000 people in the U.S. state of Oklahoma.

Education 
He earned his Bachelor of Arts with honors from East Central University in 1998 and his Juris Doctor from the University of Oklahoma College of Law where he was named a Lee B. Thompson Scholar in 2001

Early political career 
In October 1993, upon the resignation of a city councilor, Rowe was appointed to the Tishomingo, Oklahoma city council at the age of 18 while still a junior in high school.  He was elected to the council in April 1994 and then the city council elected him mayor.  He became the youngest mayor in Oklahoma history and making him one of the youngest mayors in United States history.  He served as mayor for two terms.

Legal career 
He is the former City Attorney for Tishomingo, and was a judge with the Chickasaw Nation.

Potential congressional run in 2012
In 2011, Rowe formed an exploratory committee to decide whether to run for Oklahoma's 2nd congressional district after sitting Congressman Dan Boren (D-Muskogee) announced his retirement in the 2012 election. Rowe's 2012 run was unsuccessful, as he finished in fourth place with only 10 percent of the vote.

Appointment to Oklahoma Supreme Court 

On November 20, 2019, Governor Kevin Stitt appointed Rowe the Oklahoma Supreme Court to fill the vacancy left by Patrick Wyrick who was confirmed as a federal district court judge.

See also
List of Native American jurists

References

1975 births
Living people
20th-century American lawyers
21st-century American judges
Candidates in the 2012 United States elections
East Central University alumni
Mayors of places in Oklahoma
Oklahoma city council members
Oklahoma lawyers
Oklahoma Republicans
Justices of the Oklahoma Supreme Court
People from Tishomingo, Oklahoma
People from Ada, Oklahoma
University of Oklahoma College of Law alumni
Chickasaw Nation politicians